Pyrenomyxa is a genus of fungi in the family Xylariaceae. The genus is synonymous with Pulveria Malloch & Rogerson.

References

External links
Index Fungorum

Xylariales